Alberto Moreiras (29 May 1919 – 1 February 1986) was a Spanish modern pentathlete. He competed at the 1948 Summer Olympics.

References

External links
 

1919 births
1986 deaths
Spanish male modern pentathletes
Olympic modern pentathletes of Spain
Modern pentathletes at the 1948 Summer Olympics
Sportspeople from Palma de Mallorca